Cosmic Ghost Rider is a fictional superhero appearing in American comic books published by Marvel Comics. His physical appearance and origin are an amalgam of Punisher, Ghost Rider, and Silver Surfer.

Publication history
Cosmic Ghost Rider was created by Donny Cates and Geoff Shaw, in Thanos #13 (Jan 2018). He made his debut as Thanos' right-hand man  in Thanos #13. His origin story was revealed in Thanos #16 by writer Donny Cates and artist Geoff Shaw.

Fictional character biography

Origin
In the alternate reality of Earth-TRN666, where Thanos conquered all the Universe, Frank Castle's early life was seemingly similar to that of the Frank Castle of the Earth-616 Universe. However, when Thanos came to Earth, the Punisher was one of the last casualties during the last stand of the heroes, and his soul was subsequently sent to Hell. Willing to give anything in order to punish Thanos for slaughtering his planet, the Punisher signed a demonic deal with Mephisto and became the Ghost Rider. When he returned to Earth, however, Thanos was already gone, and everything on the planet was dead. Roaming endlessly and undying with no one to kill or love, the Ghost Rider spent the next countless years alone. He eventually began to lose his mind when even Mephisto fell silent to his calls. When a badly injured Galactus arrived on Earth seeking help against Thanos, unaware that the population of Earth had already been killed by him, the Ghost Rider offered the dead planet to him in exchange for the chance of punishing Thanos as his herald which Galactus accepted. Bestowed with the Power Cosmic, Ghost Rider became Cosmic Ghost Rider.

Alongside Galactus, Cosmic Ghost Rider traveled across the cosmos on a quest to halt Thanos' systematic annihilation of every living being in existence, which led them to become legends. Their story lasted centuries, but it came to an end once they finally confronted Thanos, who beheaded Galactus as he approached to battle. Thanos offered the undying Rider the chance to see more evil than he could punish in a thousand lifetimes, and thus became his servant. Thanos then gives him a shard of the Time Stone so he could use it to travel to the past in order to drag a younger Thanos to the future so he could help in the killing of the Fallen One. The Cosmic Ghost Rider was smashed by the Fallen One using the Asgardian hammer Mjolnir.

Arrival on Earth-616
Odin from the main reality retrieved Cosmic Ghost Rider's soul from the dead reality and rewarded him with Valhalla, though Cosmic Ghost Rider was unsatisfied. Odin returned his powers and offered to revive him in any time period of his choosing. Cosmic Ghost Rider chose the day Thanos was born. Being revived in that year, Cosmic Ghost Rider confronted the baby Thanos where his Penance Stare has not detected any sins yet. Cosmic Ghost Rider then takes Baby Thanos under his wing in order to change his future so that he won't be evil. Tracking down Galactus to the planet Markus-Centauri which he plans to devour, the Cosmic Ghost Rider tried to get Galactus to help him to no avail after Galactus scanned his memories. With Uatu the Watcher bearing witness, an angry Cosmic Ghost Rider vowed to raise Thanos on his own consequently. By doing that, Cosmic Ghost Rider created a new timeline where Thanos grew up to become something worse. The Guardians of the Galaxy of that timeline tried to change their future by killing Thanos. Unfortunately, Frank and later baby Thanos killed them all. They were subsequently greeted by Thanos' future self, who sported the same clothes Cosmic Ghost Rider used as the Punisher.

Thanos from the future brings Rider and his infant self to his world where he stopped all of the wars in the universe and saved Frank's family. The Rider was happy at first until he found out that Thanos was dictator of the planets he invaded. Frank, horrified of what Thanos turned into, kills him and goes back in time to leave baby Thanos where he got him, accepting the monster Thanos will become.

In the aftermath of the "Infinity Wars" storyline, Cosmic Ghost Rider is revealed to be stranded on Earth-616 and was present at Thanos' funeral. Eros shows all the guests a recording of Thanos stating that he uploaded his consciousness in a new body before his death. The funeral is attacked by the Black Order, who steals Thanos's body and rip open a hole in space, sending everyone into the rip. Though Cosmic Ghost Rider got to safety with Star-Lord, Groot, Beta Ray Bill, Phyla-Vell, and Moondragon. Everyone is saved by the arrival of Gladiator and the Shi'ar Empire. Starfox begins to recruit warriors to find Gamora, the most likely candidate to be Thanos's new body, as they form the Dark Guardians which causes Cosmic Ghost Rider to side with them. Wraith brings up the issue of the Black Order, but Starfox assures they are searching for them and Nebula states that the team should track down Nova to find Gamora's location. The Dark Guardians found Nova and ambush him, wounding him enough to crash land onto a planet. When Gladiator and Cosmic Ghost Rider order Wraith to back off, Nova takes the chance to fly off again. The Dark Guardians plan to track him down again. Cosmic Ghost Rider and the Dark Guardians tracked down Nova and clashed with the Guardians of the Galaxy in order to take Gamora. Hela and the Black Order crash the battle where Hela takes control of Cosmic Ghost Rider leaving him a flaming skeleton and asserted Thanos' consciousness into Starfox. Hela began her work to fully resurrect Thanos. Due to being controlled by Hela, Cosmic Ghost Rider was forced to retreat with Hela and a Thanos-controlled Starfox. During the Guardians of the Galaxy and the Dark Guardians' fight with the Black Order, Hela was knocked off the platform causing her to lose control of Cosmic Ghost Rider. When confronted by Star-Lord, Cosmic Ghost Rider states that he can't hold himself together and falls apart leaving him as a pile of bones. When he arrives in Hell, Cosmic Ghost Rider is welcomed by its current ruler Johnny Blaze.

Johnny Blaze later forced Cosmic Ghost Rider to possess Avengers Mountain and attack the Avengers at the time when they were planning to exorcise Robbie Reyes.

Cosmic Ghost Rider later left Earth and began a campaign in the cosmos punishing its villains for their sins. This attracted the Shi'ar who had the Imperial Guard subdue him. Cosmic Ghost Rider was locked up in an alien prison on an asteroid that the Shi'ar Empire ran. Some of its inmates tried to kill Cosmic Ghost Rider only for him to kill them. This freed a mysterious creature that was locked up as it drained the Cosmic Ghost Rider of his energy leaving him nothing but a skull. One of the prison officers initiated the prison's self-destruct sequence which destroyed the prison and presumably the energy-eating creature. Months later, some space pirates salvaged what's left of the prison and the Cosmic Ghost Rider's skull. Upon awakening, Cosmic Ghost Rider killed the pirate crew while rebuilding his body. The only one he didn't kill was Camille Benally whose penance stare declared her innocent. Camille became Cosmic Ghost Rider's companion where they fought various villains and came into conflict with the Cosmic King. After the Cosmic King threw Cammi into the wormhole, an enraged Cosmic Ghost Rider attacked the Cosmic King who proved to be too powerful for him. When Cosmic Ghost Rider found a way to get the upper hand, the Cosmic King offered to give him his soul back after he had stolen it from Mephisto. Afterwards, Cosmic Ghost Rider killed the Cosmic King. Cammi arrived where she actually traveled through time and revealed that the Cosmic King was possessed by an ancient space demon parasite that wanted to claim Cosmic Ghost Rider as its next host as this creature is the same one that was accidentally freed from the Shi'ar prison. The Mephisto from Cosmic Ghost Rider's reality then appeared on Earth-616 to reclaim the soul of Cosmic Ghost Rider that was stolen from him. After finding out that Cosmic Ghost Rider reclaimed his soul, the alternate Mephisto chose to steal Cammi's soul instead. While fighting his way through Hell, Cosmic Ghost Rider returned to the Hotel Inferno and confronted Earth-616's Mephisto who wouldn't give Cammi's soul back. Though he did offer Cosmic Ghost Rider a deal. This deal had the Cosmic Ghost Rider serving Mephisto of Earth-616 as Cammi is revived. The space demon parasite then showed up and took control of Cammi. It drained Cosmic Ghost Rider's powers yet again. This caused Cosmic Ghost Rider to claim the lifeforce of various Brood so that he can rebuild his body and work to free Cammi from the space demon parasite.

Powers and abilities
Cosmic Ghost Rider had the same abilities as the Ghost Rider as well as Hellfire manipulation and wielding the Power Cosmic.

Cosmic Ghost Rider wields the chains that were made from the bones of his reality's Cyttorak.

In other media

Video games
 Cosmic Ghost Rider is a playable character in Marvel Contest of Champions.
 Cosmic Ghost Rider appears as an alternate costume for Punisher in Marvel Future Fight.

Collected editions

References

External links
 Cosmic Ghost Rider at Marvel Wiki
 Cosmic Ghost Rider at Comic Vine

 
 
Comics characters introduced in 2018
2018 comics debuts
Science fiction comics
Fictional characters who have made pacts with devils
Fictional characters with fire or heat abilities
Fictional characters with immortality
Guardians of the Galaxy characters
Fictional skeletons
Fictional characters from parallel universes
Fictional characters from New York City
Marvel Comics telekinetics
Fictional chain fighters
Fictional United States Marine Corps personnel
Marvel Comics demons
Marvel Comics martial artists
Marvel Comics military personnel
Marvel Comics characters with superhuman strength
Fictional characters with energy-manipulation abilities
Fictional characters with superhuman durability or invulnerability
Marvel Comics male superheroes
Fictional sole survivors
Vigilante characters in comics